Paik Sun-yup (November 23, 1920 – July 10, 2020) was a South Korean military officer. Paik is best known for his service during the Korean War, for being the first four-star general in the history of the South Korean military, and for his service as a diplomat and statesman for the Republic of Korea.

Early life and education
Paik was born in Tokhung in Kangso county, Phyŏngannamdo, Korea on November 23, 1920. He was the second of three siblings, with an older sister and younger brother, being raised by a widowed mother. In 1925 the Paik family moved to Heijō (modern Pyongyang), where they lived under deplorable conditions in a single, rented room. Unable to feed her family, Paik's mother attempted to commit family-suicide with her children by jumping from the Daidō River Bridge but was dissuaded from doing so by her eldest daughter.

Paik's mother and sister soon took jobs at a rubber factory. this in addition with the help of a greatly reduced tuition allowed Paik to attend Mansu Primary School for four years before transferring to Yaksong Primary School. After which, he spent five years in Pyongyang Normal School, studying to be a teacher. However, in 1939, instead of becoming a teacher, he entered the Mukden Military Academy of Manchukuo.

Career

Early career
After graduation from the Mukden Military Academy of Manchukuo, Paik became a second lieutenant in the Manchukuo Imperial Army and was assigned to the Gando Special Force, engaging in guerrilla suppression work in Jiandao (eastern Manchuria, Gando in Korean) as part of the Japanese campaign in northern China against the 8th Route Army of Communist China for ten months from 1944 to 1945 until its defeat by the Red Army. 
After the end of World War II, he returned to Pyongyang and started working as an assistant to Kim Gu (a leader of the Korean independence movement against the Empire of Japan). In December 1945, he fled south due to the rising communist’s presence. After safely reaching South Korea, he enlisted in the Constabulary, the predecessor of the ROK Army, as a first lieutenant. In this role, he was tasked with suppressing communist guerrillas (the Yeosu–Suncheon rebellion). While undertaking this responsibility, he helped Park Chung-hee, who was at the time being tried as a communist, by persuading President Syngman Rhee to commute his sentence and have him released. Paik eventually had him reinstated into the army during the Korean War.
Before the outbreak of the Korean War, Paik was promoted to Colonel, from which he received the command of the 5th Infantry Division on July 30, 1949. Then on April 23, 1950, had his command transferred to the 1st Infantry Division.

Korean War
When the fighting broke out at 4:00 am on June 25, 1950, he was stationed in Seoul for officer training at the Infantry School. At 7:00 am, Paik was alerted to the invasion by the 1st Infantry Division's Chief of Staff.
 
Upon receiving the alert, Paik reassumed command of the 1st Infantry Division, which was involved in heavy fighting near Kaesong and Munsan. After resisting the onslaught for three days, Paik received orders to stand his ground and fight to the last man. This was because the 1st Infantry Division was the only remaining obstacle between the North Korean People’s Army and Seoul. However, after the fall of Seoul and due to the overwhelming offensive by North Korean armored units, he was forced into a fighting withdrawal. This is significant due to the fact that the 1st Division withdrew while maintaining its order of battle while fighting a delaying action. This led to Paik being promoted to Brigadier General on July 25, 1950.
Paik then pulled back to the Nakdong River along the Pusan Perimeter, the last-ditch defense of the allied forces, on the southern tip of Korea. Here he commanded the RoK 1st Div., which was responsible for the holding of a 55 mile front on the northern boundary of the Pusan Perimeter. During which he was heavily supported by American units. Furthermore, it was during this desperate battle that he successfully commanded the first joint operation between Korean and American Forces. Though his lines were stretched thin during this battle, the RoK 1st Div. successfully held off against successive assaults by the Koreans People’s Army’s 2nd, 3rd, and 15th divisions. During this time, the RoK 1 Div. received adequate anti-tank weaponry, which allowed them to form ‘hunter-killer teams’ and destroy the North Korean’s dreaded T-34-85 tanks.
In August 1950, Paik along with Col. Michaelis, commander of the US 27th regiment, led the breakout from the Pusan Perimeter northward. The battle of Dabu-dong is seen as one of the major turning points of the Korean War.
 
The offensive northward was both rapid and brutal. However, it was during this phase of the war that Paik was honored with the recapture of both his birthplace and the capital of North Korea, Pyongyang, on October 19, 1950. After spending several days securing the city, he was ordered further northward toward the Yalu River, on the Chinese border. It was Paik who was one of the first commanders of the Allied nations to realize The People’s Republic of China’s intervention into the conflict. Paik, being fluent in Chinese, was personally able to interrogate the first Chinese prisoners of war who were captured; however, his warnings of the intervention went unheeded by the overall theater command, who did not believe that the PRC had entered the conflict. 
Later, once the threat of the Chinese was fully realized Paik would go on to assume command of the defense of northwestern Korea but was continuously pushed back both by the superior numbers and ferocity of the Chinese Second Phase Offensive. It was during this stage of the war that Paik was again promoted to the command of the ROK 1st Corp, which was tasked with the securing of eastern Korea. After he arrived to assume his new command, he found the ROK 1st Corp to be made up of green recruits and conscripts who had neither sufficient training nor battle experience; because of this, he would spend much of his early time at this post intensively training his men and fortifying the battle line.

Armistice Negotiations
Armistice talks between the United Nations and the North Koreans and Chinese began in July 1951. Paik was selected as the South Korean representative. Paik was fundamentally opposed to the peace negotiations, fearing that it would lead to the abandonment of a unified Korea.

By August, Paik was told to report back to the ROK I Corps where he oversaw the heavy fighting around the 38th parallel at the Punchbowl, a large crater surrounded by hills, and Heartbreak Ridge. His troops were now fighting a war of attrition, with both the United Nations and the Communist digging in and ever more fortifying their positions. Just as with the trench warfare of the First World War, the casualties were atrocious and there was little to show for the loss of life. In May 1952, Paik expressed to President Eisenhower the strong opposition of the Korean people to an armistice. However, due to the stagnation of the war, in the end the armistice was signed with Korea still Divided.

During the war, Paik did not make major mistakes, such as the disintegration of formations that plagued other commanders, as well as maintained a smooth relationship with the U.S. military officers. His actions and successes greatly contributed to the U.S. military's positive assessment of the ROK military. This in turn, motivated the U.S. military command to recognize the ROK military as a useful ally in the then still developing cold war.

Later career

1952 to 1986
in 1952 and 1957 he was twice appointed as the Chief of staff. afterwards, in 1959 he was appointed as the Joint Chief of staff of the Republic of Korea Army. Then After retiring from the military, he was appointed ambassador to The Republic of China in July 1960.
In July 1961, he served as the Republic of Korea ambassador to France, the Netherlands, Belgium, Spain, Portugal and Luxembourg. On July 16, 1961, while serving as ambassador to France, he traveled to Senegal as a representative of the Korea-Senegalese Friendship Mission. There he met with Senegalese Prime Minister Dudu Thiam. In 1961, he served as ambassador to Gabon, Togo, Senegal, Chad, The Congo, Madagascar, Central African Republic, Niger, Ivory Coast, Benin, Republic of the Congo,  Upper Volta and Mauritania. On August 27, 1963, while serving as the South Korean ambassador to Cameroon, Paik (then adjunct ambassador to France), established relations with President Amadou Ahizo.
In July 1965, Paik served as the first Korean Ambassador to Canada. After which he was appointed the Minister of Transportation of Korea in October 1969. Wherein, he directed the construction of Seoul's public transportation infrastructure, which included the subway system. 
In 1971, he was appointed president of Chungju fertilizer co., and served as president of Korea Integrated Chemical Inc. After which, he was appointed as the director of the National Economic Association. Then in 1972, he completed a CEO course at Yonsei University business school and in 1973 was presented a certificate by the chief executive officer of Korea University business school.
He was appointed president of Korea Chemical industries in April 1973. as whom he directed the construction of the largest fertilizing manufactory plant in South-east Asia at that time. he was later appointed president of adjunct Korea Chemical Pulp in 1974 and became president of the Fertilizer Industry Association in 1975. from 1976 to 1981, he served as director of the Korea Chemical Research Institute. In 1976, he completed a CEO course at Seoul National University business school.
In March of 1981, he resigned from his position as President of Korea Chemicals. In March 1980, after resigning from the presidency of Korea Chemical Industries he was appointed as an adviser to Fujitsu Korea. Later he was appointed the chairman of the Korea Chemical Research Institute, director of the Korea Chemical Research Institute, and National Chairperson of the International Chamber of Commerce and Industry and was appointed to the permanent Advisory Office of the National Unification Agency in 1986, which included conducting security and lecture activities.

1998 to 2020
In 1998, he was appointed chairman of the Commemorative Projects Committee on the 50th anniversary of the Korean War. From 1999 to 2001 he was selected to be the Advisory Chairman of the Advisory Committee of the No Gun Ri Incident Countermeasures Group.
In 2013, the U.S. military in Korea appointed him as an "Honorary U.S. 8th Army Commander" and as whom he would represent the U.S. 8th Army in Korea during various official events. In South Korea, President Lee Myung-Bak attempted to promote Paik Sun-yup to the position of the First Head of the ROK Armed Forces, but this was ultimately denied. 
Then in 2008, in the Pro-Japanese Personalities and People's Exhibition -published by the Institute for National Affairs- included Paik in the military section of prospective chinilpa candidates, due to his prior service in the Manchukuo Imperial Army. Furthermore in 2009, the Rho Moo-hyun administration’s National Behavior Commission included Paik sun-yup in the highly controversial list of 705 chinilpas.
In May 2008, he was appointed as an adviser to the "Committee to Promote the 60th Anniversary of the Founding of the Republic of Korea." On March 23, 2009, it was reported that the South Korean government planned to honor Paik as an honorary field-marshal in honor of the 60th anniversary of the outbreak of the Korean War. If implemented, Paik would have become South Korea's first Field-marshal, this however would not come to fruition. 

On January 30, 2019, a group in consisting of retired South Korean generals of which Paik served as an advisor, released a statement criticizing the administration of South Korean President Moon Jae-in and the Comprehensive Military Agreement which was co-signed with North Korea at the September 2018 inter-Korean summit in Pyongyang.

He died on July 10, 2020, at the age of 99, four months short of his 100th birthday and was buried in Daejeon National Cemetery. Ministry of Patriots and Veterans Affairs included the reason why Paik was buried in Daejeon National Cemetery is because, graveyard for generals in Seoul National Cemetery was full.

Awards and decorations

Historical photos

See also
Military of South Korea

Notes

References

External links 

1920 births
2020 deaths
People from Nampo
South Korean military personnel of the Korean War
South Korean anti-communists
Korea under Japanese rule
Korean people of Manchukuo
Korean collaborators with Imperial Japan
South Korean generals
South Korean Roman Catholics
Ambassadors of South Korea to Taiwan
Ambassadors of South Korea to France
Ambassadors of South Korea to Canada
Suwon Baek clan
Chiefs of Staff of the Army (South Korea)
Chairmen of the Joint Chiefs of Staff (South Korea)
Recipients of orders, decorations, and medals of Ethiopia